Macrohastina gemmifera is a moth in the family Geometridae first described by Frederic Moore in 1868. It is found in India, Nepal and China.

References

Moths described in 1868
Asthenini